Chief of Defence of the Republic of Lithuania is Chief of the Lithuanian Armed Forces and the national defence organisations.

List of Chiefs

Army Commanders (1919–1940)

Chiefs of Defence (1993–present)

See also
 Lithuanian Armed Forces

References

Military of Lithuania
Lithuania
Lists of Lithuanian military personnel